Rudolf Pöch (17 April 1870, Tarnopol, Kingdom of Galicia and Lodomeria – 4 March 1921, Innsbruck), was an Austrian doctor, anthropologist, and ethnologist.

Pöch is also known as a pioneer in photography, cinematography, and audio engineering. He can be regarded as a founding father of the Institute for Anthropology and Ethnography at the University of Vienna.

His work for the Ethnological Museum in Berlin inspired Pöch to undertake an expedition to New Guinea (1901–1906), where he was the first to find scientific evidence for the existence of pygmies. Pöchs technical equipment is especially noteworthy. It included a photo camera, a cine camera and a phonograph, which enabled Pöch to take pictures, video and audio documents of the indigenous population. His 72 recordings of songs and narratives in Papuan languages were seen as a sensation at the time.

A second expedition between 1907 and 1909 led Pöch to South Africa. During World War I, Pöch became (in)famous for his ethnological studies in prisoner of war camps.

Although many of Pöch's theories on the indigenous people of New Guinea proved false, scientific research and museums still profit from his collections. Today, his technical equipment is on display at the Naturhistorisches Museum in Vienna.

External links
 

1870 births
1921 deaths
People from Ternopil
People from the Kingdom of Galicia and Lodomeria
19th-century Austrian physicians
20th-century Austrian physicians
Austrian anthropologists
Austrian ethnologists